ISDS refers to investor-state dispute settlement, an instrument of public international law.

ISDS may also refer to:

 Inadvertent Separation Destruct System
 Integrated Software Dependent System
 International Serials Data System
 International Sheep Dog Society
 International Society for Disease Surveillance